Suvorov is a town and the administrative center of Suvorovsky District in Tula Oblast, Russia, located  west of Tula, the administrative center of the oblast. Population:

History
The village of Suvorova has been known since the 15th–16th centuries. It was granted town status in 1954.

Administrative and municipal status
Within the framework of administrative divisions, Suvorov serves as the administrative center of Suvorovsky District. As an administrative division, it is incorporated within Suvorovsky District as Suvorov Town Under District Jurisdiction. As a municipal division, Suvorov Town Under District Jurisdiction is incorporated within Suvorovsky Municipal District as Suvorov Urban Settlement.

References

Sources

Notes

Cities and towns in Tula Oblast